The 83rd Academy Awards ceremony, organized by the Academy of Motion Picture Arts and Sciences (AMPAS), honored the best films of 2010 in the United States and took place on February 27, 2011, at the Kodak Theatre in Hollywood, Los Angeles beginning at 5:30 p.m. PST (8:30 p.m. EST). During the ceremony, Academy Awards (commonly called the Oscars) were presented in 24 competitive categories. The ceremony was televised in the United States by ABC, and produced by Bruce Cohen and Don Mischer, with Mischer also serving as director. Actors James Franco and Anne Hathaway co-hosted the ceremony, marking the first time for each.

In related events, the Academy held its second annual Governors Awards ceremony at the Grand Ballroom of the Hollywood and Highland Center on November 13, 2010. On February 12, 2011, in a ceremony at the Beverly Wilshire Hotel in Beverly Hills, California, the Academy Awards for Technical Achievement were presented by host Marisa Tomei.

The King's Speech won four awards, including Best Picture. Other winners included Inception with four awards, The Social Network with three, Alice in Wonderland, The Fighter, and Toy Story 3 with two, and Black Swan, God of Love, In a Better World, Inside Job, The Lost Thing, Strangers No More, and The Wolfman with one. The telecast garnered almost 38 million viewers in the United States.

Winners and nominees

The nominees for the 83rd Academy Awards were announced on January 25, 2011, at 5:38 a.m. PST at the Samuel Goldwyn Theater in Beverly Hills, California by Tom Sherak, president of the Academy, and actress Mo'Nique. The King's Speech led the nominations with twelve, followed by True Grit with ten.

The winners were announced during the awards ceremony on February 27, 2011. Toy Story 3 became the third animated film to be nominated for Best Picture. True Grit was the second film after 2002's Gangs of New York to lose all ten of its nominations. By virtue of his nomination for Best Actor in 127 Hours, host James Franco became the first person since Paul Hogan, who was a co-host and a Best Original Screenplay nominee during the 59th ceremony in 1987, to host the ceremony while receiving a nomination in the same year. He was also the first acting nominee since Michael Caine at the 45th ceremony in 1973 to achieve this distinction. With Christian Bale and Melissa Leo's respective wins in the Best Supporting Actor and Best Supporting Actress categories, The Fighter became the first film since 1986's Hannah and Her Sisters to win both supporting acting categories.

Awards

Winners are listed first, highlighted in boldface, and indicated with a double-dagger.

Honorary Academy Awards
The Academy held its Second Annual Governors Awards ceremony on November 13, 2010, during which the following awards were presented.

Academy Honorary Award
Kevin Brownlow  For the wise and devoted chronicling of the cinematic parade.
Jean-Luc Godard  For passion. For confrontation. For a new kind of cinema.
Eli Wallach  For a lifetime's worth of indelible screen characters.

Irving G. Thalberg Memorial Award
Francis Ford Coppola

Films with multiple nominations and awards

The following 14 films received multiple nominations:

The following six films received multiple awards:

Presenters and performers
The following individuals presented awards or performed musical numbers.

Presenters

Performers

Ceremony information

In June 2010, the AMPAS hired Oscar-winning producer Bruce Cohen and veteran television producer Don Mischer to oversee production of the telecast. "I'm absolutely ecstatic that Bruce and Don have accepted my invitation to produce and direct the 83rd Academy Awards telecast," remarked Academy president Tom Sherak. "Their work in producing the Academy's inaugural Governors Awards was exceptional and I am confident they will bring their creative vision and extraordinary talent to produce/direct a most memorable Oscar show." Although the prior ceremony hosted by Alec Baldwin and Steve Martin had the highest ratings in five years, their combined age was 116 years and the producers wanted to focus on a younger demographic. The unofficial first choice was Justin Timberlake but he declined, feeling it was at least a year too early for him.

Opting for younger faces for the ceremony, Cohen and Mischer hired actor James Franco and actress Anne Hathaway as co-hosts of the 2011 ceremony. "James Franco and Anne Hathaway personify the next generation of Hollywood icons — fresh, exciting and multi-talented. We hope to create an Oscar broadcast that will both showcase their incredible talents and entertain the world on February 27," said Cohen and Mischer regarding their selections to host the gala. "We are completely thrilled that James and Anne will be joining forces with our brilliant creative team to do just that." Franco and Hathaway became the first male-female duo to co-host the awards show since comedian Jerry Lewis and actress Celeste Holm presided over the 29th ceremony in 1957. At age 28, Hathaway was also the youngest person to host an Oscar ceremony.

Furthermore, AMPAS announced that this year's ceremony was "the most interactive awards show in history". The Academy revamped their official website oscar.com to include lists of all the nominees and winners, as well as film trailers and exclusive video content produced by both AMPAS and Oscar telecaster ABC. Also, via the Academy's Twitter and Facebook pages, people could post questions for any actor or celebrity attending the festivities to answer. One of the four Oscar pre-show co-hosts would then pose selected questions to both nominees and attendees alike. For a fee of US$4.99, users had online access to two dozen video streams that would take them from the red carpet, through the ceremony and on to the post-telecast Governors Ball. Several of the cameras utilized 360-degree views that viewers could direct.

Several other people participated in the production of the ceremony. For a younger writer, France consulted Judd Apatow, who suggested Jordan Rubin who brought in Megan Amram. William Ross served as musical director and conductor for the ceremony. Production designer Steve Bass built a new stage design for the ceremony. Entertainment Weekly columnist and TV personality Dave Karger greeted guests entering the red carpet. Designer Marc Friedland designed a new envelope heralding the winner of each category made from a high-gloss iridescent metallic gold paper stock, with red-lacquered lining that featured the Oscar statuette stamped in satin gold leaf. During the run-up to the ceremony, television personality Chris Harrison hosted "Road to the Oscars", a weekly behind-the-scenes video blog. Ben Mankiewicz hosted the official ABC pre-show, giving professional betting odds for the winners. PS22 Chorus children's choir performed "Over the Rainbow" from The Wizard of Oz at the end of the ceremony.

According to Rubin, Hathaway was heavily involved during the month of preparation. Franco on the other hand was busy shooting movies, while teaching a class and getting both his masters and his PhD. When filming started, Hathaway was focused and determined while Franco was more laid back, causing friction. In the closing weeks, Franco went back to Apatow who hired four additional writers; in response, Hathaway brought in Liz Feldman. This resulted last-minute scrambling. According to Amram, "[a] lot of stuff that made it into the show was written a few days beforehand." Franco immediately left after the show ended, catching a flight to make a morning seminar on medieval manuscripts at Yale.

Box office performance of nominated films
For the second consecutive year, the field of major nominees included at least one blockbuster at the American and Canadian box offices. However, only three of the nominees had grossed over $100 million before the nominations were announced, compared with five from the previous year. The combined gross of the ten Best Picture nominees when the Oscars were announced was $1.2 billion, the second-highest ever behind 2009. The average gross was $119.3 million.

Two of the ten Best Picture nominees were among the top ten releases in box office during the nominations. At the time of the announcement of nominations on January 25, Toy Story 3 was the highest-grossing film among the Best Picture nominees with $414.9 million in domestic box office receipts. The only other top ten box office hit to receive a nomination was Inception which earned $292.5 million. Among the remaining eight nominees, True Grit was the next-highest-grossing film with $137.9 million followed by The Social Network ($95.4 million), Black Swan ($83.2 million), The Fighter ($72.6 million), The King's Speech ($57.3 million), The Kids Are All Right ($20.8 million), 127 Hours ($11.2 million), and finally Winter's Bone ($6.2 million).

Of the top 50 grossing movies of the year, 55 nominations went to 15 films on the list. Only Toy Story 3 (1st), Inception (5th), How to Train Your Dragon (9th), True Grit (17th), The Social Network (29th), The Town (32nd), Black Swan (38th), and The Fighter (45th) were nominated for directing, acting, screenwriting, Best Picture or Animated Feature. The other top-50 box office hits that earned nominations were Alice in Wonderland (2nd), Iron Man 2 (3rd), Harry Potter and the Deathly Hallows — Part 1 (6th), Tangled (10th), Tron: Legacy (12th), Salt (21st), and Unstoppable (39th).

Critical reviews
The show received a negative reception from most media publications. According to writer Bruce Vilanch, the crowd enjoyed the starting short film, but when Franco and Hathaway came on stage, it shifted. According to Rubin, Hathaway "was embracing their arrival on stage" while Franco was filming the crowd on his phone. Mara Reinstein of The Ringer said there was no single moment of failure but described the broadcast as "death by a thousand paper cuts."

Film critic Roger Ebert said, "Despite the many worthy nominated films, the Oscarcast was painfully dull, slow, witless, and hosted by the ill-matched James Franco and Anne Hathaway. She might have made a delightful foil for another partner, but Franco had a deer-in-the-headlights manner and read his lines robotically." He went on to praise the winners of the night, but he ended his review with the words, "Dead. In. The. Water." Writer David Wild called it "the world's most uncomfortable blind date between the cool rocker stoner kid and the adorable theater camp cheerleader." Television critic Tim Goodman of The Hollywood Reporter commented, "In what could go down as one of the worst Oscar telecasts in history, a bad and risky idea — letting two actors host — played out in spectacularly unwatchable fashion on the biggest of all nights for the film world." He also added, "These Oscars were a bore-fest that seemed to drag on relentlessly but listlessly." Gail Pennington of the St. Louis Post-Dispatch wrote that the ceremony "felt a little like a bad night on Saturday Night Live — awkward, slow and not particularly entertaining." Regarding the hosts, she quipped that Hathaway "at least tried", but she remarked, "Franco seemed half asleep, or possibly stoned."

Some media outlets received the broadcast more positively. Entertainment Weekly television critic Ken Tucker stated that the show was "Funny, poised, relaxed, and smart, Anne Hathaway and James Franco made for marvelous Oscar hosts. Their combination of respect and informality struck the right tone for the night, a happily surprising production that had its share of fine moments both planned and ad-libbed." On the overall aspect of the ceremony, they concluded "all in all, it was a fun, briskly paced night." Mary McNamara from the Los Angeles Times commented, "The two seemed to be following the directive to "first do no harm," as if they knew they couldn't score as big as Jimmy Fallon did with the Emmy Awards, but were determined to avoid becoming morning show fodder like Ricky Gervais was after this year's Golden Globes. The result was a show that moved along, with a few draggy bits and high notes, like precisely what it was: a very long and fancy awards show." Her review further said "Overall, the evening had an oddly business-like feel, a mind-numbing evenness that was exacerbated by the relentless predictability of the winners, and the fact that none of the acting winners were played off no matter how long their "thank-yous" went."

Ratings and reception
The American telecast on ABC drew in an average of 37.9 million people over its length, which was a 9% decrease from the previous year's ceremony. An estimated 71.3 million total viewers watched all or part of the awards. The show also drew lower Nielsen ratings compared to the two previous ceremonies, with 21.2% of households watching over a 33 share. In addition, the program scored an 11.8 rating over a 30 share among the 18–49 demographic, which was a 12 percent decrease over last year's demographic numbers.

In Memoriam 
The In Memoriam tribute, which featured Celine Dion performing the Charlie Chaplin song "Smile", paid tribute to the following individuals.

 John Barry – Composer
 Grant McCune – Visual effects
 Tony Curtis – Actor
 Edward Limato – Agent
 Tom Mankiewicz – Writer
 Gloria Stuart – Actress
 William A. Fraker – Cinematographer
 Joseph Strick – Director
 Lionel Jeffries – Actor
 Sally Menke – Editor
 Ronni Chasen – Publicist
 Leslie Nielsen – Actor
 Robert B. Radnitz – Producer
 Claude Chabrol – Director
 Pete Postlethwaite – Actor
 Bill Littlejohn – Animator
 Pierre Guffroy – Art director
 Patricia Neal – Actress
 George Hickenlooper – Director
 Irving Ravetch – Writer
 Robert Culp – Actor
 Robert F. Boyle – Art director
 Mario Monicelli – Director
 Lynn Redgrave – Actress
 Elliott Kastner – Producer
 Dede Allen – Editor
 Peter Yates – Producer, director
 Anne Francis – Actress
 Arthur Penn – Producer, director
 Theoni Aldredge – Costume designer
 Susannah York – Actress
 Ronald Neame – Director
 David L. Wolper – Producer
 Jill Clayburgh – Actress
 Alan Hume – Cinematographer
 Irvin Kershner – Director
 Dennis Hopper – Actor
 Dino De Laurentiis – Producer
 Blake Edwards – Writer, director
 Kevin McCarthy – Actor
 Lena Horne – Singer, actress

At the end of the montage, Halle Berry paid special tribute to Horne and introduced a film clip of her singing the titular song from the film Stormy Weather.

See also
 17th Screen Actors Guild Awards
 31st Golden Raspberry Awards
 31st Brit Awards
 53rd Annual Grammy Awards
 63rd Primetime Emmy Awards
 64th British Academy Film Awards
 35th Laurence Olivier Awards
 65th Tony Awards
 68th Golden Globe Awards
 List of submissions to the 83rd Academy Awards for Best Foreign Language Film

References

External links
Official sites
 Academy Awards Official website
 The Academy of Motion Picture Arts and Sciences Official website
 Oscar's Channel at YouTube (run by the Academy of Motion Picture Arts and Sciences)

News resources
 Oscars 2011 BBC
 Academy Awards coverage CNN
 Oscars 2011 The Guardian

Analysis
 2010 Academy Awards Winners and History Filmsite
 Academy Awards, USA: 2011 Internet Movie Database

Other resources
 

Academy Awards ceremonies
2010 film awards
2011 in Los Angeles
2011 in American cinema
2011 awards in the United States
February 2011 events in the United States
Television shows directed by Don Mischer